Taekwondo is one of the most popular and practiced martial arts in India. It is characterized by punching and kicking techniques, with emphasis on head-height kicks, jumping spinning kicks, and fast kicking techniques. The literal translation for tae kwon do is "kicking," "punching," and "the art or way of."

History

Master Puran Andrew Gurung introduced taekwondo to India after returning from Hong Kong to India. He studied taekwondo under Korean Great Grand Master Lee Pyung Pal from 1969 to 1974. Since 1974 he has been promoting Taekwondo after earning his 2nd Dan under Great Grand Master Lee Pyung Pal. He initially started taekwondo classes in Kalimpong, Darjeeling and Sikkim. Later he expanded his trainings to Kolkata, southern, northeast and northern parts of India. He traveled frequently to every part of India until 1984. He has been conferred the title of "Father of Taekwondo in India" by official taekwondo hall of fame USA.

Taekwondo introduced to India around 1975 and one of earliest taekwondo instructors in India was Jimmy R. Jagtiani, 8th Dan Black Belt in Taekwondo who began teaching in 1975. On 2 August, 1976 the Taekwondo Federation of India (TFI) was formed and established as a National Body of Taekwondo in India.

The World Taekwondo Federation (WTF) accorded affiliation to the Taekwondo Federation of India in 1978, the Asian Taekwondo Union (ATU) in 1982, the Indian Olympic Association (IOA) in 1985 and the South Asian Taekwondo Federation (SATF) in 1994 respectively. The Department of Youth Affairs & Sports, Government of India also granted recognition to Taekwondo Federation of India as an apex judicial and autonomous national body of taekwondo in India in 1988.

Grand Master Kiranpal, an international referee, has been working for Indian taekwondo since 1988, when for the first time taekwondo was demonstrated at the 1988 Summer Olympics. Atul Pangotra is also an international referee and coach who started his sports journey in 1988. At the 2020 Summer Paralympics, he qualified in the top 50 officials. While, Sarbjeet Singh is the first ever referee from India to officiate in the 2018 World Taekwondo Grand Prix Series and also qualified among top 50 Officials for 2020 Tokyo Paralympics.

Taekwondo practitioners representing India

Latika Bhandari 
Latika Bhandari is an Indian taekwondo practitioner. As of June 2021, she is the top-ranked female taekwondo practitioner in India. She was awarded by the Madhya Pradesh Highest Sports award Vikram Award in 2012.

Surendra Bhandari 
Surendra Bhandari won India's first medal in Taekwondo by clinching a bronze in the flyweight (58-kg) category in the 14th Asian Games.

Danish Manzoor
Danish Manzoor is a taekwondo athelete from Baramulla, Jammu and Kashmir who represented India in Israel in Open G2 Olympic ranking Taekwondo Championship 2022. In 2022, Danish became the Fit India Ambassador.

Rodali Barua 
Rodali usually represents the country in the +73kg weight category and had brought various laurels to the country. She had represented India in the World Taekwondo Championships in Korea in June 2017 and won gold at the 35th National Senior Kyorugi and 8th National Senior Pumche Taekwondo Championships held in Visakhapatnam.    Represented India in Asian Games 2018

Kashish Malik 
Kashish represented India in the 2018 Asian Games where she crashed out in the quarterfinals. She has bagged medals at various international events like, Malaysia Open G1 Tournament, Asian Games Invitation Tournament, President Cup, Fujairah Open 2018 and Israel Open 2018.

Navjeet Mann 
Navjeet Mann is a Taekwondoin based out of Bangalore and has represented India at various international events including the Asian Games 2018, World Championships 2017 and Asian Championship in the year 2016 and 2018. Navjeet’s brightest moment under the sun though came in the year 2016 when he bagged a gold medal in the 2016 South Asian Games.

Atul Raghav 
Atul Raghav is a Taekwondoin based out of Ghaziabad and has represented India at various national and international events. Atul's brightest moment under the sun though came in the year 2020 when he bagged a bronze medal in the 2020 G-2 Fujairah Dubai. Currently, he is the brand ambassador of Ghaziabad Municipal Corporation.

Aman Kumar Kadyan 
Aman Kumar Kadyan is a Taekwondoin based out of haryana and has represented India at various national and international events. He competes in -54kg and currently holds -18 Rank in the world.

Taekwondo as career in India 
Opportunities, Career & future for Taekwondo players / Taekwondoin / Taekwondo practitioners in India is an emerging trend. India is offering wide varieties of career growth for Taekwondo players. In the recent days Taekwondo in India is not only a sport, but it can be taken up as career path & profession.

Digitization  of Taekwondo  in India 
Contribution of the legendary master Gerard Robbins in the development & digitization of Taekwondo in India.

The great legendary master Gerard Robbins started a digital platform in India to bridge the gap between Taekwondo practitioners and Grand Masters.

The specialized program of digitization of Taekwondo will not only open new prospects for Taekwondoins in India but also for Taekwondoins from all over the world.

Tournament record

References